F.N.O. (Failure's No Option), the thirteenth mixtape by American rapper Lloyd Banks, was released on October 31, 2013 for free download. Hosted by DJ Drama, the mixtape features 16 tracks, with guest appearances from Vado, Styles P, Raekwon and Mr Probz. It also includes production from Sean Anderson, Doe Pesci, The Jerm, Formula 2, Ryan Alexy and Beat Butcher.

Track listing

External links
Download

2013 mixtape albums
2013 compilation albums
Albums produced by Beat Butcha
Lloyd Banks albums